The Buffalo Bandits are a lacrosse team based in Buffalo, New York playing in the National Lacrosse League (NLL). The 2009 season was the franchise's 18th season. It was also their first season in title defense since 1997.

Regular season

Conference standings

Game log
Reference:

Playoffs

Game log
Reference:

Player stats
Reference:

Runners (Top 10)

Note: GP = Games played; G = Goals; A = Assists; Pts = Points; LB = Loose balls; PIM = Penalty minutes

Goaltenders
Note: GP = Games played; MIN = Minutes; W = Wins; L = Losses; GA = Goals against; Sv% = Save percentage; GAA = Goals against average

Transactions

New players
 Sean Greenhalgh - acquired prior to last season, but did not play due to injury

Players not returning
 Kyle Laverty - selected in expansion draft

Trades

* - Hinman was acquired from the Arizona Sting in the dispersal draft

Entry draft
The 2008 NLL Entry Draft took place on September 7, 2008. The Bandits selected the following players:

Roster

See also
2009 NLL season

References

Buffalo